Jaber II Al-Mubarak Al-Sabah,  (1860 – 5 February 1917), was the eighth ruler of the Sheikhdom of Kuwait from the Al-Sabah dynasty. He was the eldest son of Mubarak Al-Sabah and is the ancestor of the Al-Jaber branch of the Al-Sabah family. He ruled the country from 28 November 1915 to his death on 5 February 1917 and was succeeded by his brother, Salim Al-Mubarak Al-Sabah.

Although his reign was very short, Jaber is known for economic reforms he initiated.

Honours and awards
 Companion of the Order of the Star of India (CSI)-23 November 1916

References

20th-century rulers in Asia
1860 births
1917 deaths
Honorary Companions of the Order of the Star of India
House of Al-Sabah
Rulers of Kuwait